Chet Atkins Picks on the Pops  is the title of a recording by Chet Atkins and Arthur Fiedler and the Boston Pops orchestra, the second they produced. The arrangements, by Richard Hayman, were recorded live in Boston’s Symphony Hall.

Track listing

Side one 
 "Delilah"
 "Ode to Billie Joe" (Bobby Gentry)
 "Scarborough Fair" (Traditional)
 "Wimoweh" (Campbell)
 "By the Time I Get to Phoenix" (Jimmy Webb)

Side two 
 "This Guy’s in Love With You" (Burt Bacharach, Hal David)
 "Spanish Harlem" (Jerry Leiber, Phil Spector)
 "Galveston" (Jimmy Webb)
 "Last Waltz" (Mason, Reed)
 "The Ballad of New Orleans/Sugarfoot Rag" (Jimmy Driftwood, Hank Garland)

Personnel 
 Chet Atkins – guitar
 Arthur Fiedler – conductor
 Richard Hayman – arranger
 Bob Moore – bass
 Jerry Carrigan – drums

References 

1969 albums
Chet Atkins albums
RCA Records albums
Albums conducted by Arthur Fiedler
Albums arranged by Richard Hayman